Michael Anthony Rizzo (born December 14, 1960) is an American baseball front office executive who is the President of Baseball Operations and general manager of the Washington Nationals of Major League Baseball (MLB).

After a brief playing career in minor league baseball, Rizzo transitioned into coaching and scouting. He became the director of scouting for the Arizona Diamondbacks in 2000. Rizzo joined the Nationals in 2006 as an assistant general manager. He succeeded Jim Bowden as the Nationals' general manager in 2009, and was promoted to team president in 2013.

Early life
Rizzo, a third-generation scout, grew up in Chicago as one of four children to Phil and Bernadine Rizzo. His father, Phil, was a former minor league baseball player who drove a truck for the city and scouted for the California Angels on a part-time basis. The Angels eventually made Phil a full-time scout, as many of the players he identified reached the majors. After 50 years in professional baseball, Phil was eventually part of the inaugural induction class that entered the Professional Baseball Scouts Hall of Fame in 2008.  Phil continued his scouting career with the Nationals as a Senior Advisor to the GM until his passing on February 1, 2020. Mike Rizzo's grandfather, Vito, was a semi-pro player before founding the family business: scouting.

Rizzo attended Holy Cross High School in River Grove, Illinois, Triton College, and Saint Xavier University, where he played college baseball for the Triton Trojans and Saint Xavier Cougars.

Early career
The Angels drafted Rizzo in the 22nd round, with the 554th overall selection, in the 1982 Major League Baseball Draft.  He played for the Salem Angels (Class A Short Season), Peoria Suns (Class A) and Redwood Pioneers (Class A Advanced) from 1982 to 1984. After the 1984 season, the Angels released Rizzo. His father suggested that he was not skilled enough to reach the major leagues, and advised he attend college.

Rizzo became an assistant coach at the University of Illinois while earning a Bachelor of Arts in Communications in 1988. Larry Himes, the scout who drafted Rizzo, became the general manager of the Chicago White Sox, and he hired Rizzo as a scout for the Upper Midwest region. While with the White Sox, Rizzo signed 2014 Hall of Fame inductee and two-time American League MVP Frank Thomas.  He also scouted for the Boston Red Sox. Rizzo joined the Arizona Diamondbacks when the franchise was created in 1998, and served as the Director of Scouting for the Diamondbacks from 2000 to 2006. He helped transform the Diamondbacks farm system with exceptionally successful drafts. Following the 2005 campaign, Rizzo was promoted to Vice President of Scouting Operations. That same year, the Diamondbacks were named Topps’ Organization of the Year. Rizzo earned a World Series ring with Arizona in 2001, and the organization brought an astounding number of homegrown players through to the Major Leagues during his tenure. Brandon Webb (2006  Cy Young Award winner), Carlos Gonzalez, Chad Tracy, Justin Upton, Stephen Drew, Dan Uggla, Micah Owings, Tony Pena, Mark Reynolds, Conor Jackson, Miguel Montero, Chris Snyder, Carlos Quentin, Max Scherzer and Brett Anderson were all signed by Arizona under Rizzo’s watch.

Washington Nationals
Seeking to replace Joe Garagiola Jr. as the Diamondbacks' general manager, the team chose Josh Byrnes over Rizzo. As a result, Rizzo joined the Washington Nationals organization, when he was appointed Assistant General Manager and Vice President of Baseball Operations by Jim Bowden on July 24, 2006. This move coincided with the franchise's ownership transfer from Major League Baseball to a Washington, D.C.-based investment group headed by Ted Lerner.

Three days after Bowden's sudden resignation on March 1, 2009, Rizzo was promoted to general manager on an interim basis by team president Stan Kasten. He was named the full-time Senior Vice President/General Manager on August 20, 2009. On October 19, 2010, Rizzo signed a five-year contract extension and was promoted to Executive Vice President of Baseball Operations and General Manager. The last two years of this contract were club options. 

On June 24, 2021 at Miami, the Nationals beat the Marlins, 7-3, marking Rizzo’s 1,000th win as General Manager since taking over the club during 2009 Spring Training. In doing so, he became the ninth active President of Baseball Operations/General Manager to reach the 1,000 win mark and the sixth active to do it with one team. Since 2012, the Nationals have the fifth-best regular season record in Major League Baseball over this span, behind only the Los Angeles Dodgers, New York Yankees, St. Louis Cardinals and Cleveland Guardians. 

The Nationals have transformed into one of Major League Baseball’s perennially elite clubs, winning a World Series in 2019, earning four National League East titles (2012, 2014, 2016, 2017) and one Wild Card berth (2019) in the last nine seasons. For his efforts in leading the Nationals, Rizzo has been honored with several awards during his tenure. In April 2022, he was inducted into the Triton College Alumni Wall of Fame. In December 2021, he was named the Italian American Baseball Foundation Executive of the Year. After winning the World Series in 2019, he was named Executive of the Year by Baseball America and the Boston Chapter of the BBWAA. The Boston Chapter of the BBWAA also honored him with the same award following the 2012 season. He also garnered Executive of the Year honors in 2012 from the Pitch and Hit Club of Chicago, which followed 2011 Man of the Year honors from the Lido Civic Club of Washington, D.C.  

Over the course of Rizzo’s tenure with the Nationals, there have been several seminal moments. In November of 2009, Rizzo convinced Davey Johnson to sign on as Senior Advisor and help revamp the Nationals’ on-field operations. In June of 2011, Rizzo appointed him field manager and Johnson led the team to its first playoff appearance and through the 2013 season. On December 5, 2010, Rizzo signed right fielder Jayson Werth to a seven-year contract that immediately changed the perception of the Nationals, especially within the industry.  Approximately one year later, Rizzo was instrumental in signing franchise cornerstone, Ryan Zimmerman, to a six-year contract extension. From 2009-12 Rizzo’s Nationals won at least 10 more games than the season prior: 59 wins in 2009, 69 in ’10, 80 in ’11, 98 in ’12. The last team to do this was the Boston Red Sox from 1906-09, making the Nationals the first team in over 100 years to complete such a feat without the benefit of an artificially deflated win total associated with a work stoppage. Rizzo decided to shut down ace pitcher Stephen Strasburg late in the 2012 season as he recovered from Tommy John surgery from the year before. The Nationals promoted Rizzo to President of Baseball Operations during the 2013 season.

Solidifying arguably the best rotation in the Major Leagues, Rizzo and the Lerner Family signed 2013 American League Cy Young Award winner, right-handed pitcher Max Scherzer to a seven-year contract and introduced him to D.C. on January 21, 2015. In Dec. of 2015, Rizzo pulled off a three-team trade that yielded shortstop Trea Turner and right-handed pitcher Joe Ross from the San Diego Padres and sent outfielder Steven Souza Jr. to the Tampa Bay Rays. With the 2016 Baseball Winter Meetings taking place at nearby National Harbor, Md., Rizzo acquired outfielder Adam Eaton from the White Sox in exchange for top prospects Lucas Giolito, Reynaldo Lopez and Dane Dunning. In 2016, the team picked up its option to extend Rizzo's contract through the 2018 season. 

With Washington ahead in the division by nearly 10.0 games following the 2017 All-Star break, Rizzo saw the opportunity to get a jump on the trade market as the non-waiver trade deadline was nearly two weeks away. On July 16 in Cincinnati, with the club trying to complete the four-game sweep of the Reds that afternoon, Rizzo fortified Washington’s bullpen by acquiring relievers Sean Doolittle and Ryan Madson from the Oakland Athletics. From July 17 through the end of the season, the Nationals paced the National League with a 3.36 bullpen ERA. Rizzo was not finished improving the club in 2017, as he made two more deals as the deadline neared. On July 28, he solidified Washington’s bench by acquiring veteran Howie Kendrick from the Philadelphia Phillies. Moments before the July 31 deadline, Rizzo strengthened Washington’s bullpen even further with the acquisition of Minnesota Twins closer and American League All-Star, Brandon Kintzler. On April 5, 2018, Rizzo signed a contract extension through the 2020 season. When Kendrick went down with an Achilles injury on May 19, 2018, Rizzo made the call to bring the 19-year-old Juan Soto to the Major Leagues. From that day Soto put together one of the best seasons by a teenager in Major League history. 

After 11 seasons as the head of Washington’s baseball operations – Rizzo guided the Washington Nationals to the 2019 World Series title, defeating the Houston Astros in seven games and securing the franchise's first championship on October 30, 2019. Rizzo's contract was then extended through 2023, giving him a raise above his $4 million per year salary.

In a span of approximately 26 hours from July 29-30, 2021, Rizzo and the Washington Nationals acquired 12 players via six trades around the trade deadline. Those 12 players included Josiah Gray, Keibert Ruiz, Riley Adams, Mason Thompson, Gerardo Carrillo and Donovan Casey, among others. Other notable contributors Rizzo has brought in via trade during his tenure include Nelson Cruz, Josh Bell, Gio Gonzalez, Tanner Roark, Blake Treinen, Mark Melancon, Wilson Ramos, Denard Span, Kurt Suzuki, Michael Morse, and Sean Burnett, among others.

Personal life
Rizzo lives in Washington, D.C., with his wife, Jodi. His son, Michael Jr. is an entrepreneur living in San Diego, Calif.

References

External links

1960 births
Living people
American people of Italian descent
Arizona Diamondbacks executives
Boston Red Sox scouts
Chicago White Sox scouts
Major League Baseball executives
Major League Baseball general managers
Businesspeople from Chicago
Peoria Suns players
Redwood Pioneers players
Salem Angels players
Washington Nationals executives
Saint Xavier Cougars baseball players